Dayi County is a county of Sichuan Province, China, it is under the administration of the prefecture-level city of Chengdu, the provincial capital. It is Chengdu City's westernmost division, bordering the prefecture-level divisions of Ya'an to the south and the Ngawa Tibetan and Qiang Autonomous Prefecture to the north.

The Jianchuan Museum Cluster is located in the town of Anren, Dayi County, about one hour's drive from the provincial capital Chengdu. It consists of 15 museums which showcase China's largest private collection of artifacts amassed during the last 60–70 years.

Climate

References

External links

Geography of Chengdu
County-level divisions of Sichuan